Events from the year 1478 in France

Incumbents
 Monarch – Louis XI

Events

Births

Full date missing
Jacques Dubois, anatomist (died 1555).

Deaths

Full date missing
John VIII, Count of Vendôme, nobleman (born 1425)
Joachim Rouault, soldier

See also

References

1470s in France